Algebraic notation (or AN) is the standard method for recording and describing the moves in a game of chess. Also called standard notation, it is based on coordinate notation, a system of coordinates to uniquely identify each square on the chessboard. It is used by most books, magazines, and newspapers. In English-speaking countries, the parallel method of descriptive notation was generally used in chess publications until about 1980. A few players still use descriptive notation, but it is no longer recognized by FIDE, the international chess governing body.

The term "algebraic notation" may be considered a misnomer, as the system is unrelated to algebra.

Naming the squares
Each square of the chessboard is identified by a unique coordinate pair—a letter and a number—from White's point of view. The vertical columns of squares, called , are labeled a through h from White's left (the ) to right (the ). The horizontal rows of squares, called , are numbered 1 to 8 starting from White's side of the board. Thus each square has a unique identification of file letter followed by rank number. For example, the initial square of White's king is designated as "e1".

Naming the pieces

Each piece type (other than pawns) is identified by an uppercase letter. English-speaking players use the letters K for king, Q for queen, R for rook, B for bishop, and N for knight (since K is already used and is a silent letter in knight). S (from the German Springer) was also used for the knight in the early days of algebraic notation and is still used in some chess problems (where N stands for nightrider, a popular fairy chess piece).

Different initial letters are used by other languages. In chess literature, especially that intended for an international audience, the language-specific letters are often replaced by universally recognized piece symbols; for example, ♞c6 in place of Nc6. This style is known as Figurine Algebraic Notation (FAN). The Unicode Miscellaneous Symbols set includes all the symbols necessary for FAN.

In both standard algebraic notation and FAN, pawns are not identified by a letter or symbol, but rather by the absence of one.

Notation for moves
In short algebraic notation (SAN), each move of a piece is indicated by the piece's uppercase letter, plus the coordinate of the destination square. For example, Be5 (bishop moves to e5), Nf3 (knight moves to f3). For pawn moves, a letter indicating pawn is not used, only the destination square is given. For example, c5 (pawn moves to c5).

Captures 
For example, Bxe5 (bishop captures the piece on e5). When a pawn makes a capture, the file from which the pawn departed is used to identify the pawn. For example, exd5 (pawn on the e-file captures the piece on d5). In older German, Russian, or Italian publications, a colon is sometimes used instead of "x", either in the same place the "x" would go (B:e5) or at the end (Be5:).

En passant captures are indicated by specifying the capturing pawn's file of departure, the "x", the destination square (not the square of the captured pawn), and (optionally) the suffix "e.p." indicating the capture was en passant. For example, exd6 e.p.

Some texts, such as the Encyclopaedia of Chess Openings (ECO), omit any indication that a capture has been made. (For example, Be5 instead of Bxe5; ed6 instead of exd6 or exd6 e.p.) When it is unambiguous to do so, a pawn capture is sometimes described by specifying only the files involved (exd or even ed). These shortened forms are sometimes called abbreviated algebraic notation and minimal algebraic notation.

Disambiguating moves

When two (or more) identical pieces can move to the same square, the moving piece is uniquely identified by specifying the piece's letter, followed by (in descending order of preference):
 the file of departure (if they differ)
 the rank of departure (if the files are the same but the ranks differ)

Theoretically, it may be necessary to specify both the file and rank of departure if neither alone is sufficient to identify the piece, but this almost never happens in practice as it would require at least two promoted pieces (for example three queens) to be necessary.

In the diagram, both black rooks could legally move to f8, so the move of the d8-rook to f8 is disambiguated as Rdf8. For the white rooks on the a-file which could both move to a3, it is necessary to provide the rank of the moving piece, i.e., R1a3.

In the case of the white queen on h4 moving to e1, neither the rank nor file alone are sufficient to disambiguate from the other white queens. As such, this move is written Qh4e1.

As above, an "x" can be inserted to indicate a capture; for example, if the final case were a capture, it would be written as Qh4xe1.

Pawn promotion
When a pawn promotes, the piece promoted to is indicated at the end of the move notation, for example: e8Q (promoting to queen). In standard FIDE notation, no punctuation is used; in Portable Game Notation (PGN) and many publications, pawn promotion is indicated by the equals sign (e8=Q). Other formulations used in chess literature include parentheses (e.g. e8(Q)) and a forward slash (e.g. e8/Q).

Draw offer
This is not usually included in published game scores.

Castling 
Castling is indicated by the special notations 0-0 (for  castling) and 0-0-0 ( castling). While the FIDE description of algebraic notation  uses the digit zero (0-0 and 0-0-0), PGN uses the uppercase letter O (O-O and O-O-O).

Check  
A move that places the opponent's king in check usually has the symbol "+" appended. Alternatively, sometimes a dagger (†) or the abbreviation "ch" is used. Some publications indicate a discovered check with an abbreviation such as "dis ch", or with a specific symbol. Double check is usually indicated the same as check, but is sometimes represented specifically as "dbl ch" or "++", particularly in older chess literature. Some publications such as ECO omit any indication of check.

Checkmate 
Checkmate at the completion of moves is represented by the symbol "#" in standard FIDE notation and PGN. The word mate is commonly used instead; occasionally a double dagger or a double plus sign (++) is used, although the double plus sign is also used to represent "double check" when a king is under attack by two enemy pieces simultaneously. A checkmate is represented by "" (the not equal sign) in the macOS chess application. In Russian and ex-USSR publications, where captures are indicated by ":", checkmate can also be represented by "X" or "x".

End of game 
The notation 1–0 at the completion of moves indicates that White won, 0–1 indicates that Black won, and ½–½ indicates a draw. In case of forfeit, scores 0–0, ½–0, and 0–½ are also possible. If player(s) lost by default, results are +/−, −/+, or −/−.

Often there is no indication regarding how a player won or lost (other than checkmate, see above), so simply 1–0 or 0–1 may be written to show that one player resigned or lost due to time control or forfeit. Similarly, there is more than one way for a game to end in a draw. Sometimes direct information is given by the words "White resigns" or "Black resigns", though this is not considered part of the notation but rather a return to the surrounding narrative text.

Similar notations
Besides the standard (or short) algebraic notation already described, several similar systems have been used.

Long algebraic notation
In long algebraic notation (LAN), also known as full/fully expanded algebraic notation, both the starting and ending squares are specified, for example: e2e4. Sometimes these are separated by a hyphen, e.g. Nb1-c3, while captures are indicated by an "x", e.g. Rd3xd7. Long algebraic notation takes more space and is no longer commonly used in print; however, it has the advantage of clarity. Some books using primarily short algebraic notation use the long notation instead of the disambiguation forms described earlier. Both short and long algebraic notation are acceptable for use in FIDE rated games.

A form of long algebraic notation (without piece names) is also used by the Universal Chess Interface (UCI) standard, which is a common way for graphical chess programs to communicate with chess engines (e.g., for AI).

ICCF numeric notation
In international correspondence chess the use of algebraic notation may cause confusion, since different languages employ different names (and therefore different initial letters) for the pieces, and some players may be unfamiliar with the Latin alphabet. Hence, the standard for transmitting moves by post or email is ICCF numeric notation, which identifies squares using numerical co-ordinates, and identifies both the departure and destination squares. For example, the move 1.e4 is rendered as 1.5254. In recent years, the majority of correspondence games have been played on on-line servers rather than by email or post, leading to a decline in the use of ICCF numeric notation.

PGN
Portable Game Notation (PGN) is a text-based file format for storing chess games, which uses standard English algebraic notation and a small amount of markup. PGN can be processed by almost all chess software, as well as being easily readable by humans. For example, the Game of the Century could be represented as follows in PGN:

Formatting

A game or series of moves is generally written in one of two ways; in two columns, as White/Black pairs, preceded by the move number and a period:
1. e4 e5
2. Nf3 Nc6
3. Bb5 a6
or horizontally:
1. e4 e5 2. Nf3 Nc6 3. Bb5 a6
Moves may be interspersed with commentary, called . When the  resumes with a Black move, an ellipsis (...) fills the position of the White move, for example:
1. e4 e5 2. Nf3
White attacks the black e-pawn.
2... Nc6
Black defends and develops simultaneously.
3. Bb5
White plays the Ruy Lopez.
3... a6
Black elects Morphy's Defence.

Annotation symbols

Though not technically a part of algebraic notation, the following are some symbols commonly used by annotators, for example in publications Chess Informant and Encyclopaedia of Chess Openings, to give editorial comment on a move or position.

The symbol chosen is simply appended to the end of the move notation, for example, in the Soller Gambit: 1.d4 e5?! 2.dxe5 f6 3.e4! Nc6 4.Bc4+/−

On moves

On positions

History
Descriptive notation was usual in the Middle Ages in Europe. A form of algebraic chess notation that seems to have been borrowed from Muslim chess, however, appeared in Europe in a 12th century manuscript referred to as “MS. Paris Fr. 1173 (PP.)”. The files run from a to h, just as they do in the current standard algebraic notation. The ranks, however, are also designated by letters, with the exception of the 8th rank which is distinct because it has no letter. The ranks are lettered in reverse – from the 7th to the 1st: k, l, m, n, o, p, q.

Another system of notation using only letters appears in a book of Mediaeval chess, Rechenmeister Jacob Köbel's Schachzabel Spiel of 1520.

Algebraic notation exists in various forms and languages and is based on a system developed by Philipp Stamma in the 1730s. Stamma used the modern names of the squares (and may have been the first to number the rqanks), but he used p for pawn moves and the capital original  of a piece (A through H) instead of the initial letter of the piece name as used now. Piece letters were introduced in the 1780s by Moses Hirschel, and Johann Allgaier with Aaron Alexandre developed the modern castling notation in the 1810s.

Algebraic notation was popularized in English in 1847 by Howard Staunton in his book The Chess-Player's Handbook. Staunton credits the idea to German authors, and in particular to "Alexandre, Jaenisch, and the Handbuch ." While algebraic notation has been used in German and Russian chess literature since the 19th century, the Anglosphere was slow to adopt it, using descriptive notation for much of the 20th century. Beginning in the 1970s, algebraic notation gradually became more common in English language publications, and by 1980 it had become the prevalent notation. In 1981, FIDE stopped recognizing descriptive notation, and algebraic notation became the accepted international standard.

Piece names in various languages
The table contains names for all the pieces as well as the words for chess, check, and checkmate in several languages. Several languages use the Arabic loanword alfil for the piece called bishop in English; in this context it is a chess-specific term which no longer has its original meaning of "elephant".

See also
 Chess notation
 Chess annotation symbols

Notes

References

External links

FIDE Laws of Chess (see Appendix C. Algebraic notation)

Chess notation